Chappel is a village and civil parish in the Borough of Colchester, Essex which sits on the River Colne. It is significant for its Victorian viaduct, which crosses the Colne valley.

Name and history 
The present name of Chappel derives from the construction of a small chapel of ease, noted in 1285 AD as standing at the northern boundary of the parish of Great Tey. During the 16th century, because of concerns from Chappel residents about the distance to Great Tey's own church at festival time, this area was split from the parish and become a separate entity known as Pontisbright (lit. "Britric's bridge") that would eventually become known as Chappel.

In 1433, the vicar of Great Tey agreed that the inhabitants of Chappel could find and elect their own chaplain. The benefice itself was united with that of the neighbouring village of Wakes Colne in 1938. The chapel itself, now the parish church of St Barnabas, is a grade I listed building.

Chappel Viaduct

The Chappel viaduct was built between 1847 and 1849 for the Colchester and Stour extension of the Eastern Counties Railway. Originally planned to be a timber structure, the viaduct was built of locally made brick because of the additional cost of maintaining a timber structure. Approximately 600 men were involved in the construction, most of whom were local East Anglians. The cost of construction was approximately £21,000 (approximately £2.2 million in 2016 money).

The piers consist of two shafts, separated by a  opening, and joined at top and bottom by arches; each shaft contain a hollow void  by  maximum, partially filled with concrete to the level of the bottom arch. The running level of the viaduct has a gradient of 1 in 120

The viaduct became a listed monument in 1967, and is thought to be one of the largest brick-built structures in England after Ouse Valley Viaduct in Sussex and  Battersea Power Station.

During the commemoration events to mark 50 years since the end of the Second World War, Chappel's beacon was transported by rail to a point on the viaduct where it could be seen from the playing field below, and lit after a ceremonial silence, the beginning and end of which were marked by the release of two maroons.

The first passenger train to Sudbury, carrying an official party from Colchester, ran on 2 July 1849. The viaduct currently carries the Marks Tey to Sudbury branch railway (Gainsborough Line), which connects regularly with trains to and from London's Liverpool Street Station.

Amenities
The village has a pub dating from the 13th century, a parish church, a United Reformed church, a post office and general store, village hall and a railway station, Chappel and Wakes Colne station, which houses the East Anglian Railway Museum. It also has a children's play area which was upgraded in 2007-08 by Chappel Parish Council.

In celebration of the millennium, the Chappel Millennium Green was opened. The Millennium Green has two areas: a nature reserve with board walk and a mown grass area for general recreation isbordered by a gravel path. It has also hosted several events, including the burning of a beacon and Colne Valley Festival events.

Village sign 
Chappel's village sign depicts a bridge crossing a river, symbolic of the old bridge, dating from 1140 AD, which crossed the river Colne and connected the two halves of the estate of Crepping Manor. The lord of the manor was, at that time, responsible for its upkeep.

Notable former residents
Margery Allingham (1904 - 1966), author of fiction - mainly crime and mystery novels.
Al Barnes (born 1968), former guitarist in the seminal Black Metal Band Venom.

References

External links

Chappel Parish Council website
Football team
Views of the village and railway
Chappel Beer Festival Information Page

Villages in Essex
Borough of Colchester